Handy Man is the fourth studio album by American rock 'n' roll singer-songwriter Del Shannon. It features the singles Mary Jane and Handy Man, which reached #22 on the Billboard Hot 100 in August 1964.

Track listing

References

1964 albums
Del Shannon albums